For a cricketer to score  a century (100 runs or more) on his Test match debut is considered a notable achievement, and as of December 2022, it has been accomplished 113 times by 111 players. Two of those players, Lawrence Rowe and Yasir Hameed, have scored centuries in both innings of their debut match. Players representing 11 of the Test-playing nations (all except Afghanistan) have scored centuries on Test debut.

In the first Test match played, between Australia and England in March 1877, Charles Bannerman became the first player to score a century in Test cricket. In a match in which no other player scored more than 20 runs in either innings for Australia, Bannerman scored 165 not out. That score remained the highest on debut until R. E. Foster scored 287 for England against Australia in 1903. Foster's innings was the highest score in Test cricket until 1930, and remains the highest score amongst Test debutants. His double-century is one of seven made on Test debut, the other six were scored by Lawrence Rowe, Brendon Kuruppu, Mathew Sinclair, Jacques Rudolph, Kyle Mayers and Devon Conway. Nine players (Bill Ponsford, Doug Walters, Alvin Kallicharran, Mohammad Azharuddin, Greg Blewett, Sourav Ganguly, Rohit Sharma, James Neesham, and Abid Ali) went on to make centuries in the second test as well. Mohammad Azharuddin is the only player to score centuries in his first three tests.

When he scored his debut hundred, Bangladesh's Mohammad Ashraful became the youngest player to score a century in Test cricket, at the age of 17 years and 61 days. Adam Voges is the oldest player to have done so on debut, aged 35 years and 243 days when he scored 130 not out for Australia against the West Indies in June 2015. The 100th century on Test debut was by South African Stiaan van Zyl, who scored 101* against the West Indies in Centurion in December 2014, whilst the 100th player to score a century on Test debut was his compatriot Stephen Cook, who scored 115 against England at the same ground in 2016.

David Hopps asked "Why is it that 100 Test batsmen, previously unchosen, have now trodden this path?" He notes, "There is often an advantage that bowlers have had no time to explore their deficiencies, but most influential of all must be the hunger that runs through their veins."

Key

Test centuries on debut

Notes

References

Test cricket records